Bikash Khawas (born July 21, 2001) is a Nepalese professional footballer who plays as a right-back for the Nepal national team.

References

2001 births
Living people
Nepalese footballers
Nepal youth international footballers
Nepal international footballers
Association football defenders
Nepal Super League players
People from Morang District